Posyolok imeni Mamontova is a rural locality (a settlement) in Mamontovsky Selsoviet, Pospelikhinsky District, Altai Krai, Russia. The population was 1,435 in 2014. There are 4 streets.

Geography 
Posyolok imeni Mamontova is located 10 km southwest of Pospelikha (the district's administrative centre) by road. Krutoy Yar is the nearest rural locality.

References 

Rural localities in Pospelikhinsky District